Polemon robustus, or the Zaire snake-eater, is a species of rear-fanged venomous snake in the family Atractaspididae. The species is endemic to Africa.

Geographic range
Polemon robustus is found in the Central African Republic and the Democratic Republic of the Congo.

References

Further reading
de Witte GF, Laurent RF (1947). "Revision d'un groupe de Colubridae africains: genres Calamelaps, Miodon, Aparallactus, et formes affines ". Mém. Mus. Roy. Hist. Nat. Belgique (sér. 2) 29: 1–134. (Miodon robustus, new species, p. 62). (in French).

Atractaspididae
Reptiles described in 1943